Hajji Khvosh (also Romanized as Ḩājjī Khvosh; also known as Ḩajjt Khowsh) is a village in Mokriyan-e Sharqi Rural District, in the Central District of Mahabad County, West Azerbaijan Province, Iran. At the 2006 census, its population was 907, in 144 families.

References 

Populated places in Mahabad County